Vääna-Jõesuu is a village in Harku Parish, Harju County in northern Estonia. It has a population of 1184 (as of 1 December 2019).

References

Villages in Harju County